Planet Organic is a British supermarket chain, with thirteen stores in London as of March 2022.

History 
Planet Organic was founded by the American entrepreneur Renée Elliott. She opened the first store in 1995 in Westbourne Grove, West London.  It is reported to have been the UK's first organic supermarket. 

Planet Organic is now the UK’s largest fully certified organic supermarket and sells over 8,000 product lines in eight stores within the M25. 

In January 2020, Planet Organic announced a partnership with delivery company Supper, offering different dishes to be ordered and delivered from the company's two Tottenham Court Road stores. In 2020, Planet Organic announced plans to double their current store numbers within the next 4 years, expanding their overall number to around 18 stores.

In March 2020, Planet Organic acquired London based chain As Nature Intended, in a move that will nearly double the current estate owned by Planet Organic.

References

External links
 Official website

1995 establishments in England
British brands
Companies based in the City of Westminster
British companies established in 1995
Retail companies established in 1995
Retail companies of the United Kingdom
Supermarkets of the United Kingdom